Reginald Brettauer Fisher CBE FRSE (13 February 1907 – 11 November 1986) was a British biochemist, specialising in the study of proteins.

Life

He was born on 13 February 1907 the son of Joseph Sudbury Fisher. He was educated in King Edward VII School, Sheffield. He then studied sciences at the University of Oxford. On graduation in 1933 he became a Demonstrator in Chemistry at the university. In 1939 he won a Rockefeller Travelling Scholarship.

In the Second World War he worked as a Research Officer for the Ministry of Home Security and was later seconded to the Air Ministry. This appears to be connected to the British production of Sarin. In March 1945 he was raised to the rank of Honorary Wing Commander. He returned to the University of Oxford after the war.

In 1959 he accepted the post of Professor of Biochemistry at the University of Edinburgh. In 1960 he was elected a Fellow of the Royal Society of Edinburgh. His proposers were David Whitteridge, Lord Perry, Robert Brown and Reginald Passmore. He resigned from the Society in 1977 

In 1966 he was belatedly appointed a Commander of the Order of the British Empire (CBE) for services to the Ministry of Defence during the war.

He died on 11 November 1986.

Publications

Uric Acid Synthesis in Pigeons (1935)
Protein Metabolism (1954)

Family

In 1929 he married Mary Saleeby (b.1905) daughter of C. W. Saleeby. Mary had was tutored by D. H. Lawrence.

Artistic Recognition

The National Portrait Gallery, London hold 6 photographs of Fisher.

References

1907 births
1986 deaths
Fellows of the Royal Society of Edinburgh
Alumni of the University of Oxford
Academics of the University of Oxford
Academics of the University of Edinburgh
British biochemists
20th-century non-fiction writers
People educated at King Edward VII School, Sheffield